Andrés Soler (born Andrés Díaz Pavia; 18 November 1898 – 26 July 1969) was a Mexican actor. He was considered one of the greatest figures of the Golden Age of Mexican cinema. Soler appeared in about two hundred films and received four Ariel Award for Best Supporting Actor nominations in his long career.

Early life
Andrés Soler was born in Saltillo, Coahuila as Andrés Díaz Pavía on 18 November 1898 to Domingo Díaz García and Irene Pavía Soler. He was the younger brother of Fernando Soler and the elder brother of Domingo Soler, Julián Soler, and Mercedes Soler. His family is known as the Soler Dynasty.

Selected filmography
 I'm a Real Mexican (1942)
 La razón de la culpa (1942)
Romeo and Juliet (1943)
 Michael Strogoff (1944)
 A Day with the Devil (1945)
 Fly Away, Young Man! (1947)
 Jalisco Fair (1948)
 Over the Waves (1950)
 Serenade in Acapulco (1951)
 María Montecristo (1951)
 Engagement Ring (1951)
 Women Without Tomorrow (1951)
 If I Were a Congressman (1952)
 A Place Near Heaven (1952)
 Snow White (1952)
The Rapture (1954)
The Viscount of Monte Cristo (1954)
Take Me in Your Arms (1954)
 When I Leave (1954)
 Look What Happened to Samson (1955)
 The Miracle Roses (1960)
 Juan Polainas (1960)

Death
On 26 July 1969, Andrés Soler unexpectedly died at his residence in Mexico City at the age of 70. His cause of death was cerebral embolism.

Soler was interred at the Panteón Jardín in San Ángel. Thousands of people attended his funeral to say goodbye and offer their condolences. Katy Jurado, Luis Aguilar, Carmelita González, and Elsa Cárdenas were also present to memorize him.

References

External links
 

1898 births
1969 deaths
Mexican male film actors
20th-century Mexican male actors
Male actors from Coahuila